The Boxing Tournament at the 1982 Asian Games was held in Delhi, India from 27 November to 3 December 1982. South Korea dominated the competition with seven gold medals.

South Korea finished first in medal with winning seven gold medals.

Medalists

Medal table

References

External links
Olympic Council of Asia

 
1982 Asian Games events
1982
Asian Games
1982 Asian Games